The Jew (Portuguese: O Judeu)  is a 1996 Brazilian-Portuguese co-production film directed by Jom Tob Azulay with Filipe Pinheiro in the title role, Dina Sfat, and Mário Viegas as the king. It tells the story of the writer António José da Silva, nicknamed "the Jew", burned at the stake during the reign of King João V of Portugal in 1739.

Cast
Felipe Pinheiro - António José da Silva
Dina Sfat – Lourença Coutinho
Mário Viegas – D. João V
Cristina Aché – Leonor
Edwin Luisi – Alexandre de Gusmão
Fernanda Torres – Brites
José Neto – D. Marcos
Ruy de Carvalho – Padre Pantoja
Sinde Filipe – Marquês do Alegrete
Santos Manuel – Professor
Rogério Paulo – Promotor do Santo Ofício
António Anjos – Secretário de D. Nuno
Sérgio Godinho – António Teixiera
Fernando Curado Ribeiro – Bispo D. Teotónio
Ruth Escobar – Rainha D. Maria
Cândido Ferreira - Padre

References

1996 films
Brazilian drama films
Portuguese drama films